Bouzegza Keddara is a town and commune in Boumerdès Province, Algeria.

Population
According to the 1998 census it has a population of 8,484.

History
 First Battle of the Issers (1837)

Notable people

References

Communes of Boumerdès Province